Kiersnówek  (Kersnivok) is a village in the administrative district of Gmina Brańsk, within Bielsk County, Podlaskie Voivodeship, in north-eastern Poland.

References

Villages in Bielsk County